The FA WSL Spring Series (2017 season) was Everton Ladies Football Club's third season competing in the FA Women's Super League.

Due to the reorganisation of top-level women's football in England, the 2017 season only covered half of a traditional season's length, while the FA WSL shifted its calendar to match the traditional autumn-to-spring axis of football in Europe. For the same reason, there is no Champions League qualification nor relegation for which to be competed.

First Team

Transfers

New contracts

In

Out

Competitions

Women's Super League 2

League table

Results summary

Results by matchday

Matches

FA Cup

Statistics

Players without any appearance are not included.

|-
|colspan="14"|Goalkeepers:
|-

|-
|colspan="14"|Defenders:
|-

|-
|colspan="14"|Midfielders:
|-

|-
|colspan="14"|Forwards:
|-

Honours
 FA WSL Players' Player of the Spring Series: Michelle Hinnigan
 FA WSL Head Coach of the Spring Series: Andy Spence

References

Everton F.C. (women) seasons
Everton